The 2015–16 Gonzaga Bulldogs men's basketball team represented Gonzaga University in the 2015–16 NCAA Division I men's basketball season. The team was led by head coach Mark Few, who was in his 17th season as head coach. The team played its home games at McCarthey Athletic Center, which had a capacity of 6,000. The Bulldogs (also informally referred to as the Zags) played in their 36th season as a member of the West Coast Conference. They finished the season 28–8, 15–3 in WCC play to finish in a share for the WCC regular season championship. They defeated Portland, BYU, and Saint Mary's to be champions of the WCC tournament and earn the conference's automatic bid to the NCAA tournament. As a #11 seed, they defeated Seton Hall and Utah to advance to the Sweet Sixteen where they lost to Syracuse. The final AP Poll is the most recent poll in which Gonzaga was unranked. They have since been ranked for 85 straight weeks from November, 2016-2021.

Previous season

The 2014–15 Gonzaga Bulldogs team were predicted to finish atop of the conference by the West Coast Conference Preseason Poll. The Zags finished in first place in the West Coast Conference Standings for the 18th time with a 17–1 conference record after BYU defeated the Zags in the regular season finale, snapping the nation's longest active home winning streak of 41 games, as well as Gonzaga's school record 22-game winning streak. The Bulldogs then went on to beat BYU in the West Coast Conference tournament, and claimed their 14th WCC tournament title, along with punching their 18th ticket to the NCAA tournament. Gonzaga entered the 2015 NCAA tournament as a #2 seed in the South region, and dismantled #15 seed North Dakota State, #7 seed Iowa, and #11 seed UCLA, to gain its second trip to the Elite Eight, as well as Mark Few's first as head coach. The Zags then fell to #1 seed (and eventual national champion) Duke, and finished the season with a 35–3 record, which were the most wins in school history.

Offseason

Coaching changes

Additions to staff

Player departures

Incoming transfers

2015 recruiting class

2016 recruiting class

Roster

 Roster is subject to change as/if players transfer or leave the program for other reasons.
 Josh Perkins suffered a broken jaw in a November 2014 game and wasn't cleared to play with full contact until late April 2015. He was granted a medical hardship waiver and will have 4 years of eligibility remaining effective at the start of the 2015–16 season.
 Jesse Wade graduated high school in 2015, but before enrolling in college at Gonzaga, he left for a 2-year LDS mission in Lyon, France, and will arrive on campus as a freshman in Fall 2017.
 Przemek Karnowski did not play after the Bulldogs' fifth game of the season, a November 27, 2015 win over UConn, due to back problems. On December 31, it was announced that he would undergo surgery and miss the rest of the season. At the time his surgery was announced, it had not been decided whether Karnowski would apply for a medical hardship waiver and play at Gonzaga in 2016–17, or turn professional after this season. He ultimately chose to remain at Gonzaga and play in the 2016–17 season.

Coaching staff

Rankings

Schedule
Gonzaga's non-conference schedule included home games against Arizona, UCLA, Montana, Northern Arizona, Mount St. Mary's, and Saint Martin's. Gonzaga played true road games at SMU and Washington State, and also faced off with Pittsburgh in the Armed Forces Classic in Okinawa, Japan. The Zags were invited to play in the Battle 4 Atlantis, where they played against three of the following in the Bahamas: Syracuse, UConn, Texas, Michigan, Texas A&M, Washington, and Charlotte. Gonzaga also played Tennessee in the 13th annual Battle in Seattle at KeyArena. Gonzaga played 18 conference games (home-and-home) during the season. Gonzaga will be featured on the ESPN networks at least 14 times in 2015–16. The WCC Tournament will feature 5 games televised on the ESPN networks.

|-
!colspan=12 style="background:#002967; color:white;"| Exhibition

|-
!colspan=12 style="background:#002967; color:white;"| Regular Season

|-
!colspan=12 style="background:#002967; color:white;"| WCC Regular Season

|-
!colspan=12 style="background:#002967; color:white;"| WCC Tournament

|-
!colspan=12 style="background:#002967; color:white;"| NCAA tournament

See also
 2015–16 Gonzaga Bulldogs women's basketball team
 2015–16 West Coast Conference men's basketball season

Footnotes

References

Gonzaga Bulldogs men's basketball seasons
Gonzaga
Gonzaga
Gonzaga
Gonzaga